Bettina Fulco (born 23 October 1968) is a retired tennis player from Argentina. She reached her highest ranking of world No. 23 on 10 October 1988.

She began playing tennis at age ten, at the university club in her hometown of Mar del Plata, having been inspired to start because of the increased interest in the sport in Argentina due to Guillermo Vilas' success. As a junior, Bettina was among the best in the world, reaching the finals of the Orange Bowl 18-and-under championships in 1986, and finishing second in the junior rankings in 1986. She turned professional in 1987. Like many South American players, Bettina Fulco was considered a clay-court specialist, and reached the quarterfinals of the French Open in 1988. Bettina beat Martina Navratilova in Houston 1994 for her biggest career victory. She also achieved victories over Conchita Martínez, Arantxa Sánchez Vicario, Hana Mandlíková, Katerina Maleeva, Manuela Maleeva, Magdalena Maleeva, Claudia Kohde-Kilsch, Lori McNeil and Nathalie Tauziat. She retired from professional tennis in 1998.

Since retiring from tennis, Bettina has been the director of the School of Tennis at the Club Atlético Kimberley, based in Mar del Plata. She is also a coach, having worked with notable players such as Victoria Azarenka, Kateryna Bondarenko, Angelique Widjaja and Emma Laine. In addition, Bettina was the captain of the Argentina Fed Cup team from 2011 to 2013.

WTA career finals

Singles: 2 (2 runner-ups)

Doubles: 3 (3 titles)

ITF Circuit finals

Singles: 6 (2–4)

Doubles: 3 (1–2)

Grand Slam singles performance timeline

Source

References

External links
 
 
 

1968 births
Living people
Argentine female tennis players
Olympic tennis players of Argentina
Sportspeople from Mar del Plata
Tennis players at the 1988 Summer Olympics